Celestial Navigations was an American music and story-telling group with members Geoffrey Lewis, Geoff Levin, David Campbell, Eric Zimmerman, Betty Ross, and Chris Many. Their performances consisted of Lewis telling a story along with electronic music to enhance the story. Lewis received a Drama-Logue Award for his performances.

Early beginnings
The group was formed in 1984 and was originally known as The Great American Entertainment Show. When they performed at the Matrix Theatre in Los Angeles, Lewis won a Drama-Logue Award for his performance.

According to Lewis, he was inspired by a trip to Africa and the attention storytellers received, and therefore started to envision his own stories to tell.

Over the next two decades, the group recorded eight albums.

Albums

References

External links
 

Musical groups from Los Angeles
American storytellers
Songwriters from California